The 2019 Women's Professional Lacrosse League season is the 2nd season of Women's Professional Lacrosse League.

Regular season standings

Schedule

League Leaders
 Goals: (4 tied) 8: Dana Dobbie, Marie McCool, Kylie Ohlmiller, Halle Majorana
 Assists: (2 tied) 6: Hannah Nielsen, Dempsey Arsenault
 Points: (2 tied) 13: Hannah Nielsen, Dempsey Arsenault
 Saves: 26: Gussie Johns
 Ground balls: 12: Dempsey Arsenault

References

Women's Professional Lacrosse League
Women's Professional Lacrosse League
Lacrosse